The Church of St James is a Church of England parish church in Taunton, Somerset, England. It dates from the early 14th century, although an earlier church, associated with Taunton Priory, was located on the same site in the 10th century. The church is dedicated to St. James the Greater. It is a Grade II* listed building.

The church backs onto the Somerset County Ground and forms a familiar backdrop to the Cricket ground.

The waggon roof above the nave and north aisle is medieval. The font dates from the 15th century and the pulpit from 1633. There are fragments of 15th century stained glass in the West end. Other stained glass is from Clayton and Bell in the 19th century.

The iron railings around the churchyard are from the early 19th century.

The parish is part of Diocese of Bath and Wells.

See also
 List of towers in Somerset
 List of ecclesiastical parishes in the Diocese of Bath and Wells

References

External links
 
 St James' Church web site

Taunton
Buildings and structures in Taunton
Grade II* listed buildings in Taunton Deane
Grade II* listed churches in Somerset
Sandstone churches in England